Christian Lawyers Association v Minister of Health is a case in which the Transvaal Provincial Division of the High Court of South Africa ruled on the constitutionality of the Choice on Termination of Pregnancy Act, the law which governs abortion in South Africa. The Christian Lawyers Association claimed that abortion violates section 11 of the Constitution, which provides that "Everyone has the right to life." The government noted an exception (a demurrer) on the grounds that constitutional rights do not apply to fetuses and that there was therefore no case to answer. The court accepted the government's argument and the case was dismissed.

References
 

Abortion case law
Abortion in South Africa
Gauteng Division cases
South African persons case law
1998 in South African law
1998 in case law